Israel–Samoa relations are bilateral ties between the State of Israel and the Independent State of Samoa. Israel is accredited to Samoa from its embassy in Wellington, New Zealand. Samoa has an honorary consul in Israel, resides in Ness Ziona.

History 
The State of Israel and the Independent State of Samoa officially established relations on 30 May 1972. Since the establishment of the diplomatic relations, Israel and Samoa are working side by side and having cooperation in many sectors. Those sectors including Development and climate change, which will affect Samoa, and the whole area of the Pacific, dramatically.

In September 2014, the Israeli vice-minister of Foreign Affairs, Tzachi Hanegbi, has paid a visit in Apia along with the Israeli ambassador in New Zealand, Yosef Livna. The Israeli delegation arrived in Samoa to attend a conference  about the Small Island countries in the Pacific and the Caribbean.

In January 2017, a Samoan Parliament Member said that his country must always back Israel, "Whatever Happens".

In March 2019, the Israeli Prime Minister, Benjamin Netanyahu, had a meeting with the Samoan Prime Minister, Tuilaepa Aiono Sailele Malielegaoi, They have signed on a visa-waiver agreement. In 2020, the Samoan PM had a meeting with another Israeli leader, President Reuven Rivlin, they have both attended a conference of the Pacific countries in Fiji.

References 

Samoa
Bilateral relations of Samoa